Adedeji Sasaenia Oresanya (13 March 1946 – 22 March 1998) was a Nigerian officer who was Military Governor of Oyo State from July 1988 to August 1990 during the military regime of General Ibrahim Babangida.

Colonel Oresanya signed the Edict establishing the Oyo State University of Technology, later renamed the Ladoke Akintola University of Technology, on 23 April 1990.

References

Nigerian generals
Governors of Oyo State
Yoruba military personnel
1946 births
1998 deaths